Frenchman Lake may refer to:

 Frenchman Flat
 Frenchman Lake (California)
 Frenchman Lake (Nova Scotia)
 Frenchman Lake (Yukon)